Ocle Priory was a priory near Ocle Pychard in Herefordshire, England at . It was a dependency of Lyre Abbey in Normandy and as such an alien priory.

References

Monasteries in Herefordshire
Benedictine monasteries in England
Benedictine monasteries in the United Kingdom
Alien priories in England